In 2007, a local TV station in Mazar-I-Sharif, Afghanistan aired a reality television show modeled after the America's Next Top Model.  International media took notice and dubbed the show Afghanistan's Next Top Model.

References

External links
 Indian Express, Lifting the veil in Afghanistan
 Telegraph, UK, Afghan TV channel seeks models
 Australian Broadcasting Corporation, Models reveal beauty under the burqa

Afghan television series
Top Model
2007 Afghan television series debuts